Angela Lanfranchi (born June 12, 1950) is an American breast cancer surgeon and anti-abortion activist. In 1999, she co-founded the Breast Cancer Prevention Institute with Joel Brind, John T. Bruchalski, and William L. Toffler. As of 2014, she is the president of the institute. She is known for advocating for a link between abortion and breast cancer, as well as for claiming that the pill has serious adverse health effects, such as causing women who take it to prefer partners more genetically similar to themselves. In 2014, she was the keynote speaker at the World Congress of Families in Melbourne, Australia.

References

Living people
American surgeons
1950 births
American anti-abortion activists
Women surgeons
21st-century American women